Jevđević, sometimes written Jevdjević may refer to:

Dobroslav Jevđević (1895–1962), a Bosnian Serb politician and Chetnik leader
Miloš Jevđević (born 1973), a Serbian football player

Serbian surnames